The nonequilibrium partition identity (NPI) is a remarkably simple and elegant consequence of the fluctuation theorem previously known as the Kawasaki identity:

(Carberry et al. 2004). Thus in spite of the second law inequality which might lead one to expect that the average would decay exponentially with time, the exponential probability ratio  given by the FT exactly cancels the negative exponential in the average above leading to an average which is unity for all time.

The first derivation of the nonequilibrium partition identity for Hamiltonian systems was by Yamada and Kawasaki in 1967.  For thermostatted deterministic systems the first derivation was by Morriss and Evans in 1985.

Bibliography

See also
 Fluctuation theorem – Provides an equality that quantifies fluctuations in time averaged entropy production in a wide variety of nonequilibrium systems
 Crooks fluctuation theorem – Provides a fluctuation theorem between two equilibrium states; implies the Jarzynski equality

External links
 Jarzynski equality on arxiv.org
 

Statistical mechanics
Non-equilibrium thermodynamics
Equations